Peeter Jakobson may refer to:
 Peeter Jakobson (politician) (1875–?), Estonian politician 
 Peeter Jakobson (writer) (1854–1899), Estonian writer